Everything Changed... is the debut extended play (EP) by American musical duo Social House, released on August 9, 2019, through School Boy Records and Republic Records.

Critical reception
Nicole Almeida of Atwood Magazine gave the EP a positive review stating that "[the EP] is an eclectic and addictive body of work which shows the diverse nature of the duo’s influences", adding "everything [Social House] do[es], they do well".

Track listing
Track listing adapted from Tidal.

All tracks produced by Charles Anderson, Michael Foster and Anton Göransson, except for "Boyfriend" produced by Edgar Barrera, Steven Franks and Tommy Brown.

Notes
 "Haunt You" contains uncredited vocals from Ariana Grande.
 "Boyfriend" is stylized in all lowercase.

Charts

References

2019 EPs
EPs by American artists